David L. Bernstein served as President and CEO of the Jewish Council for Public Affairs (JCPA) from 2016-2021. Until his appointment, David served as a consultant dedicated to assisting organizations and communities in strengthening their Israel education, engagement and advocacy work. He is also founder of CultureSolutions LLC, which works with non-profits on strategic planning and culture change efforts.

He served as Executive Director of The David Project from August 2010 to September 2014. During his time at The David Project, David transformed and re-branded the organization, focusing on the need for expanding relationships with campus opinion leaders, intensifying efforts at particular campuses and utilizing a more nuanced approach for discussions about Israel.

David also held senior roles with the American Jewish Committee (AJC), where he began as director of the Washington regional office and served in management roles overseeing regional offices and national and local programming and advocacy. During his time at AJC, David was a leading advocate for Israel on the legislative, diplomatic, media and inter-group relations fronts. He has provided pro-Israel media training in cities across the country and to Israeli diplomats based in the U.S.

References

Living people
American nonprofit chief executives
Year of birth missing (living people)